Tapered integration is a term from organization theory that refers to a mix of vertical integration and market exchange. Upstream, a producer might manufacture some of the input itself and buy the remaining portion from independent firms. Downstream, the manufacturer might sell a portion of its output through an in-house sales force and use independent sales forces to sell the remainder.

It is not documented when the term tapered integration was first used, though it can be found in law journals such as the Yale Law Journal as early as the 1950s, the first known use in academia being a case study by William King Norris.

Examples
Examples for tapered integration are (1) Tim Hortons owning some of its retail outlets but also using franchising, (2) Coca-Cola and Pepsi both having integrated bottling subsidiaries while also relying on independent bottlers for production and distribution in some markets, or (3) BMW which uses both in-house market research from its Corporate Center Development and external market research from independent, specialized firms.

Advantages/Disadvantages

Advantages
 Expansion of input channels without significant capital outlays
 Use of internal cost information to negotiate contracts with market firms
 Motivation tool for both internal division and market firms
 Protection against holdup risk

Disadvantages
 Both internal and external production may stay below minimum eff. scale
 coordination and monitoring problems
 Inefficient internal divisions may be kept when not efficient

References

Literature
 Porter, M. E. (1998). Competitive strategy: Techniques for analyzing competitors and industries. 2nd edition, New Jork: The Free Press.
 Besanko, D., Dranove, D., Shanley, M., Schaefer, S. (2013). Economics of Strategy. 6th edition, Hoboken, NJ: Wiley.

Business economics